South Sea Island (also known as Vunivandra or Vunivadra) is a tiny island within the Mamanuca Islands of Fiji in the South Pacific. The islands are a part of the Fiji's Western Division.

Geography
Vunivadra is a low reef island, one of the smallest among the Mamanuca group. It's home to a private resort.

References

External links

Islands of Fiji
Mamanuca Islands